Cecilio Ugarte (born 29 November 1947) is a Spanish gymnast. He competed in seven events at the 1972 Summer Olympics.

References

1947 births
Living people
Spanish male artistic gymnasts
Olympic gymnasts of Spain
Gymnasts at the 1972 Summer Olympics
Sportspeople from Vitoria-Gasteiz
Gymnasts from the Basque Country (autonomous community)